The 3rd Pearl International Film Festival took place in Kampala, Uganda from 13 to 16 May 2013. King's Virgin won Best Picture. Film director Prince Joe Nakibinge was awarded the best director prize. Film director Matt Bish was the festival chief jury. He was previously the winner of best film at the 2nd edition in 2012.  The festival also had special screenings of two African films, Nairobi Half Life and Nina's Dowry that initially vied for the Best Foreign Film award that was later removed from the categories.

Awards

The following awards were presented at the 3rd edition:

Best Editing
Kayongo Ivan Kavan (Semester)

Best Supporting Actor
Mageye Hassan (King's Virgins)

Best Supporting Actress
Abha Kalsi (Hang Out)

Best Script /Writer
Nakulima Jennifer (Omugugu gw’ekibi)

Best Sound
King’s Virgins

Best Cinematography
Kayongo Ivan Kavan (Semester)

Best Production Design
Wasajja Joshua (King's Virgins)

Best Short Film
E’nda The Suicide Note

Best Short Film Documentary
Defying the Odds

Best Media House
Vision Group

Media Personality
Polly Kamukama

Special Award
Hussein Kagolo

Best Actress in a lead
Nakulima Jennifer (Omugugu gw’ekibi)

Best Actor in a lead
Bijampora Herbert (E’nda The Suicide Note)

Best Director
Prince Joe Nakibinge (King's Virgins)

Best Feature Film
King’s Virgins

References

Film festivals in Uganda
2013 in Uganda